

Walter Krüger (27 February  1890 – 22 May 1945) was a German SS official during the Nazi era. In World War II, he commanded the SS Division Polizei, the SS Division Das Reich, and the VI SS Army Corps (Latvian). At the end of the war, Krüger committed suicide.

Career

Born in Strasbourg, Alsace-Lorraine, German Empire (today France), Krüger was the son of an army officer and attended cadet school. As a young officer, he joined an artillery regiment during World War I. After World War I, he joined the paramilitary Freikorps and fought in the Baltic region during 1919.

From 1933, Krüger worked in the Reichswehr and Wehrmacht training department. In 1935, he joined the SS-Verfügungstruppe and served as an instructor at the SS Officer's school at the SS-Junker School Bad Tölz. He earned the Knight's Cross of the Iron Cross, after taking command of the SS Division Polizei, which fought on the Leningrad front.

Krüger became commander of the SS Division Das Reich in March 1943. After that, he went on to become the inspector general of infantry troops of the Waffen-SS. He was then posted to the VI SS Army Corps (Latvian), a paper command. On 22 May 1945, Krüger committed suicide in the Courland Pocket fourteen days after the surrender of Nazi Germany.

Awards

 Iron Cross (1939)  2nd Class (13 June 1940) & 1st Class (22 June 1940)
 Knight's Cross of the Iron Cross with Oak Leaves and Swords
 Knight's Cross on 13 December 1941 as commander of the SS Polizei Division
 Oak Leaves on 31 August 1943 as commander of SS Division Das Reich
 Swords on 11 January 1945 as commanding general of the VI SS Army Corps

References

Citations

Bibliography

 
 

1890 births
1945 deaths
SS-Obergruppenführer
Recipients of the Knight's Cross of the Iron Cross with Oak Leaves and Swords
Nazis who committed suicide
Waffen-SS personnel
Suicides in Latvia
1945 suicides
Military personnel from Strasbourg
German Army personnel of World War I